Krasny Most (Tləmydž Ptlyź) is a rural locality (a khutor) in Krasnooktyabrskoye Rural Settlement of Maykopsky District, Russia. The population was 40 as of 2018. There are 3 streets.

Geography 
Krasny Most is located 13 km northwest of Tulsky (the district's administrative centre) by road. Sadovy is the nearest rural locality.

References 

Rural localities in Maykopsky District